The Laurel School District is a public school district based in Laurel, Mississippi (USA).

It serves almost all of Laurel.

Administration (2022-23)

Leadership
Dr. Toy L. Watts, Superintendent

Dr. Michael Eubanks, Assistant Superintendent of Operations

Board of Trustees

Nancy Breland, Vice President	

Dr. James Johnson-Hill President	

Sandy Holifield, Secretary

Doncella Milton, Member

-vacant-, Member

Directors

Chief Financial Officer: Mrs. Emily Beach
Child Nutrition: Ms. Sabrina Jones
District Police Chief: Mr. Kevin Flynn
Title IX/Technology: Mr. Albert Galeas
Chief Support Officer: Mrs. Candace Henderson
Exceptional Education: Dr. Dorsetta Jordan
Chief Academic Officer: Mrs. Kristina Pollard

Schools

**Laurel Career/Technical Center (9th – 12th/CTC)**'

Principal: Dr. Jasmine Baldwin Smith
Counselor: Dr. Yolanda Bartee
Student Services Coordinator: Ms. Tricia Pittman 

**Laurel Education Center "Alternative School"**'

Supervising Principal/Assistant Athletic Director: Dr. Jaymar Jackson

**Laurel High School (9th – 12th/CTC)**'

Supervising Principal: Mr. Eric Boone
Assistant Principal: Mr. Lorenzo Bridges
Assistant Principal: Mr. Marcus Luckett
Dean of Instruction: Mrs. Celeta Trotter       
Athletic Director: Mr. Ryan Earnest
11th/12th Counselor: Ms. Kelven Coleman
9th/10th Grades Counselor: Mrs. Franchell King 

**Laurel Middle School (6th – 8th)**'

Supervising Principal: Ms. Brandi Calahan
Assistant Principal: Mr. Demetrius Goff
Assistant Principal: Mrs. Jastassia White
6th/7th Grades Counselor: Mrs. Karrah Goar 
6th/8th Grades Counselor: Dr. Tamika Owens

**Laurel Magnet Schools of the Arts (4K – 6th)**'

Supervising Principal: Dr. Kiana Pendelton, 
Lead Teacher: Mrs. Tabitha Rayner
Counselor:  Mrs. Paige Cochran

**Laurel Upper Elementary School (4th & 5th)**'

Supervising Principal: Mrs. Shanetra Addae
Assistant Principal: Mrs. Jasmine Haynes
Counselor: Mrs. Belinda Hall

**Mason Elementary School (4K - 3rd)**'

Supervising Principal: Dr. Tirrase L. Bishop
Assistant Principal: Dr. Heather Jones
Counselor: (shared with Laurel Magnet School of Arts)

**Oak Park Elementary School (4K - 3rd)**'

Supervising Principal: Dr. Leander Bridges, II
Assistant Principal: Ms. Rachel Virgess
Counselor: Mrs. Lisa Denman

See also
List of school districts in Mississippi

References

External links
 

Education in Jones County, Mississippi
School districts in Mississippi